Furkan is a Turkish Islamic masculine given name, which means "criterion, proof, evidence, affirmation, testament".

Furkan is also the name of a Qur'anic chapter Al-Furqan.

People with the name include:
Furkan Akar (born 2002), Turkish short track speed skater
Furkan Aldemir (born 1991), Turkish basketball player with Galatasara
Furkan Andıç (born 1990), Turkish actor and model
Furkan Asena Aydın (born 1992), Turkish female taekwondo practitioner (middleweight division)
Furkan Aydın (born 1991), Turkish footballer
Furkan Doğan (1991–2010), Turkish-American student killed in the Gaza flotilla raid
Furkan Korkmaz (born 1997), Turkish basketball player for the NBA's Philadelphia 76ers
Furkan Oruç (born 1996), Turkish archer
Furkan Özçal (born 1990), in a Turkish footballer
Furkan Ulaş Memiş (born 1991), Turkish amateur boxer who competed at the 2008 Olympics at flyweight
Furkan Yalçınkaya (born 1986), Turkish volleyball player

See also
Al-Furqan (Arabic: سورة الفرقان ) (The Criterion, The Standard), the 25th sura of the Qur'an with 77 ayat
Furqan Force, volunteer fighting force when Pakistan was formed
The True Furqan, al-Furqan al-Haqq, a book written in Arabic mirroring the Qur'an but incorporating elements of traditional Christian teachings

Arabic masculine given names
Turkish masculine given names